Corythoichthys paxtoni, commonly known as Paxton's pipefish, is a species of marine fish of the family Syngnathidae. It is endemic to the Coral Sea, being found in the Great Barrier Reef, the Chesterfield Islands, and New Caledonia. This species mates monogamously and is ovoviviparous, with males carrying eggs until giving birth to live young.

The generic name is derived from Greek korys or korythos which means "helmet" and ichtys which means "fish". The specific name honours Dr John R. Paxton, the former Curator of Fishes, Australian Museum, Sydney.

References

Further reading

Atlas of Living Australia
Government of Australia Department of the Environment and Energy

paxtoni
Marine fish
Fish described in 1977
Fish of the Pacific Ocean